Bethanie Mattek-Sands and Jamie Murray were the defending champions and successfully defended their title, defeating Chan Hao-ching and Michael Venus in the final, 6–2, 6–3. This is the third straight Mixed Doubles title Murray has won at the US Open, following his championships in 2018 (with Mattek-Sands) and 2017 (with Martina Hingis).

Seeds

Draw

Finals

Top half

Bottom half

References

External links
 Main Draw
2019 US Open – Doubles draws and results at the International Tennis Federation

Mixed Doubles
US Open – Mixed doubles
US Open – Mixed doubles
US Open (tennis) by year – Mixed doubles